Berito Kuwaru'wa is a member of the Colombian U'wa people. He was awarded the Goldman Environmental Prize in 1998 for his role as spokesperson in conflicts between the U'wa people and the petroleum industry.

References

Colombian environmentalists
Living people
Colombian people of indigenous peoples descent
Indigenous activists of the Americas
Year of birth missing (living people)
Goldman Environmental Prize awardees